Yemets is a surname. Notable people with the surname include: 

Dmitri Yemets (born 1974), Russian author
Grigoriy Yemets (born 1957), Ukrainian athlete
Illia Yemets (born 1956), Ukrainian physician and politician
Vladyslav Yemets (born 1997), Ukrainian football player
Volodymyr Yemets (1937–1987), Soviet Ukrainian football player and manager